The 2013 season was the Denver Broncos' 44th in the National Football League (NFL) and their 54th overall. It also marked their 30th season under the ownership of Pat Bowlen, the second with Peyton Manning as the team's starting quarterback and the third under head coach John Fox.

Following a loss to the eventual Super Bowl champion Baltimore Ravens in the divisional round of the 2013 playoffs, the Broncos entered the 2013 season as favorites to win Super Bowl XLVIII. However, the team underwent a tumultuous offseason that was dominated by the suspension of All-Pro linebacker Von Miller as well as several injuries to the offensive line. Notable offseason additions include the free agent acquisitions of wide receiver Wes Welker, linebacker Shaun Phillips, safety Quentin Jammer and cornerback Dominique Rodgers-Cromartie. Roster departures include wide receiver Brandon Stokley, linebackers Elvis Dumervil and D. J. Williams, and running back Willis McGahee.

The Broncos' 606 points (37.9 points per game) scored in the regular season is the highest total for any team playing a 16-game season. Throughout the regular season, numerous individual, league and franchise records were set, including Peyton Manning setting new NFL records for passing touchdowns and passing yardage, as well as the team setting new NFL records for touchdowns and points scored in a single season. He was named MVP for the season. During the team's mid-season bye week, head coach John Fox received a health scare that resulted in Fox missing four games due to recuperation from heart surgery. Defensive coordinator Jack Del Rio served as the team's interim head coach during Fox's absence.

The Broncos won their third consecutive AFC West division title, as well as earning a first-round bye and homefield advantage throughout the playoffs for a second consecutive season. The Broncos defeated the San Diego Chargers 24–17 in the Divisional round, the New England Patriots 26–16 in the AFC championship game, and faced the Seattle Seahawks in Super Bowl XLVIII – the Broncos' first Super Bowl berth since winning back-to-back Super Bowls in 1997 and 1998. However, the Broncos were unable to recover from a 22–0 halftime deficit, and the Seahawks' No. 1 ranked defense held the Broncos' No. 1 ranked offense to their lowest scoring output of the season, routing the Broncos by a score of 43–8. They also scored fewer than 27 points in all three of their playoff games despite only doing so once during the regular season. Despite leading the league in points scored, the Broncos were 22nd in points allowed, with 399.

Coaching and front-office changes
January 15: Offensive coordinator Mike McCoy was hired as the new head coach of the San Diego Chargers. That same day, the Broncos hired Cory Undlin as the team's new secondary coach. Undlin served as the defensive quality control coach last season, and he replaces Ron Milus, whose contract was not renewed. The team cited that Milus' coaching style clashed with several players during the past two seasons.
January 17: Adam Gase, who spent the past two seasons as the Broncos' quarterbacks coach, was promoted to offensive coordinator, replacing Mike McCoy.
January 18: Greg Knapp was hired as the team's new quarterbacks coach, replacing Adam Gase.
February 11: Assistant special teams coach Keith Burns was hired to the same position with the Washington Redskins. His position was filled two days later (February 13), with the hiring of Derius Swinton, who spent the 2012 season as the Kansas City Chiefs' special teams quality control coach.
May 1: The Broncos parted ways with Keith Kidd, who served as the team's director of player personnel for the past four seasons. The team hired Tom Heckert, Jr. as Kidd's replacement six days later (May 7). Heckert previously served as a general manager with the Philadelphia Eagles from 2006 to 2009 and most recently with the Cleveland Browns from 2010 to 2012.
May 13: Alex Gibbs, who served as the Broncos' offensive line coach from 1995 to 2003, was hired as an offensive consultant.
May 31: John Spytek was hired as the team's director of college scouting. Spytek previously worked in the same capacity during the past two seasons with the Cleveland Browns, alongside former Browns' general manager Tom Heckert, Jr.

Absence of John Fox
On November 2, 2013, during the Broncos' bye week, head coach John Fox was hospitalized after experiencing light-headedness while playing golf in Charlotte, North Carolina. Fox was held in a Charlotte-area hospital for further testing, and doctors indicated that he needed aortic valve replacement surgery and would be out for up to two months. Fox knew about his heart condition, and had initially hoped to postpone his surgery until after the season, however, two days later (November 4), Fox underwent the successful surgery. Defensive coordinator Jack Del Rio was named the interim head coach during Fox's absence. On December 2, Fox returned to the Broncos' training camp facility at Dove Valley, in preparation for the team's Week 14 game against the Tennessee Titans.

Roster changes

Free agents

Signings

Departures

Trades
On August 20, defensive tackle Sealver Siliga was traded to the Seattle Seahawks in exchange for guard John Moffitt. On November 5, Moffitt was placed on the reserve/left squad list.

Draft

Draft trades

Undrafted free agents
All undrafted free agents were signed just after the 2013 NFL draft concluded on April 27, unless noted otherwise.

Von Miller suspension

On July 22, 2013, All-Pro linebacker Von Miller was initially suspended for a duration of four games due to his violation of NFL's drug policy, though initial reports indicated that his suspension did not involve the NFL's Steroids and Related Substances Policy. The Denver Post reported that Miller tested positive for marijuana and amphetamine during his rookie season in 2011 on multiple occasions. Miller appealed the suspension. However, on August 20 Miller's suspension period was increased from four to six games due to findings of other drug testing issues within the previous two years. On September 9, reports circulated that the Broncos were attempting to re-claim a $1.25 million signing bonus from Miller as a result of the suspension. On September 22, ESPN reported that the reason for Miller's suspension being increased from four to six games was due to Miller attempting to cheat a drug test with the aid of a urine collector, which nearly led to Miller being suspended for the entire  season.

Injuries
July 24: Guard Chris Kuper, along with center J. D. Walton, was placed on the Physically Unable to Perform (PUP) list. Kuper recovered from ankle surgery, resulting from an injury that forced him to miss the majority of the 2012 season. Kuper was later activated on August 13, and returned to practice that same day.
July 28: Center Dan Koppen suffered a ruptured ACL in his knee during the fourth day of training camp, and was placed on the season-ending injured reserve on July 30.
August 3: The Denver Post reported that tight end Joel Dreessen underwent arthroscopic knee surgery during the offseason. Dreessen missed the first three games of the regular season.
August 17: Cornerback Champ Bailey injured his left foot during the team's second preseason game against the Seattle Seahawks, and missed the majority of the regular season after re-aggravating the injury during the team's Week 7 loss to the Indianapolis Colts.
August 27: Center J. D. Walton was moved from the active PUP list to the reserve PUP list, and missed the first eight weeks of the regular season. Walton originally underwent surgery on his left ankle back in June – the same ankle that he fractured and dislocated during the team's September 30, 2012 game vs. the Oakland Raiders last season. However, he later suffered an infection that hindered his recovery. Walton was later waived on December 17. Also on August 27, safety Quinton Carter was placed on injured reserve due to aftereffects from a knee injury that he suffered last season.
August 31: Rookie defensive end Quanterus Smith, the team's fifth-round selection in the 2013 NFL draft, was placed on injured reserve. Smith suffered a torn ACL in his knee during his 2012 senior season at Western Kentucky, and though he participated in all four of the Broncos' preseason games, the team determined that Smith had not fully recovered from the injury.
September 15: All-Pro offensive tackle Ryan Clady injured his foot during the team's Week 2 win over the New York Giants. Three days later (September 18), the team announced that Clady suffered a Lisfranc fracture, and placed him on the season-ending injured reserve.
October 6: Linebacker Wesley Woodyard suffered a stinger in his neck during the team's Week 5 win over the Dallas Cowboys, and missed the team's next two games.
November 17: Safety Rahim Moore suffered a lower leg injury, while tight end Julius Thomas sprained his knee during the Broncos' Week 11 win over the Kansas City Chiefs. Thomas missed the team's next two games, while Moore and was diagnosed with lateral compartment syndrome in his lower left leg the following day (November 18). Moore was placed on the injured reserve, with a designation to return. He missed the remainder of the regular season, and was eligible to return for the playoffs, but had a slow recovery and missed the Super Bowl.
November 24: Defensive tackle Kevin Vickerson suffered a dislocated hip during the Broncos' Week 12 loss to the New England Patriots, and was placed on the season-ending injured reserve three days later (November 27).
November 29: Defensive tackle Derek Wolfe fell ill as the Broncos were boarding a team bus to Kansas City, two days before their Week 13 game vs. the Kansas City Chiefs. Wolfe was rushed to a Denver-area hospital, and was diagnosed with seizure-like symptoms the following day (November 30), and missed the remainder of the regular season. He also missed the Broncos' first playoff game on January 12, 2014, against the San Diego Chargers, and was officially placed on the season-ending injured reserve two days later (January 14).
December 8: Wide receiver Wes Welker suffered a concussion during the Broncos' Week 14 win over the Tennessee Titans – his second concussion in a three-week span. Welker missed the remainder of the regular season, but was cleared by team doctors for game action on December 30, and returned for the Broncos' first playoff game on January 12, 2014.
December 22: Linebacker Von Miller injured his knee during the Broncos' Week 16 win over the Houston Texans. The following day (December 23), the team confirmed that Miller tore the ACL in his right knee, and Miller was placed on injured reserve on December 24.
January 12, 2014: Cornerback Chris Harris, Jr. tore the ACL in his left knee during the Broncos' 24–17 Divisional playoff win over the San Diego Chargers, and was placed on injured reserve two days later (January 14).

Staff

Final roster

Preseason

Regular season

Schedule

Note: Intra-division opponents are in bold text.

Game summaries

Week 1: vs. Baltimore Ravens
NFL Kickoff Game

The Broncos kicked off their 2013 season at home against the Baltimore Ravens in the NFL kickoff game, in a highly publicized rematch of their 2012 Divisional playoff game. The Ravens grabbed the early lead in the first quarter, with quarterback Joe Flacco tossing a 2-yard touchdown pass to fullback Vonta Leach. Following a Flacco interception, the Broncos responded early in the second quarter, with quarterback Peyton Manning throwing a 24-yard touchdown pass to tight end Julius Thomas. After Broncos' wide receiver Wes Welker muffed a punt return near the goal line, the Ravens grabbed the lead, with running back Ray Rice rushing for a 1-yard touchdown, but the Broncos responded, with Manning connecting with Julius Thomas on another touchdown pass – from 23 yards out. The Ravens grabbed a 17–14 lead just before halftime, with placekicker Justin Tucker nailing a 25-yard field goal. However, the Broncos reeled off 28 unanswered points, with Manning throwing four more touchdown passes – a 28-yarder to wide receiver Andre Caldwell, two to Welker from 5 and 2 yards out, followed in the fourth quarter by a 26-yarder to wide receiver Demaryius Thomas. The second score came after Broncos' safety David Bruton blocked a Sam Koch punt. The Ravens later scored 10 unanswered points, with Flacco throwing a 13-yard touchdown to wide receiver Marlon Brown, followed by a 30-yard field goal from Tucker to pull to within 42–27 with 5:29 remaining in the fourth quarter. However, the Broncos subsequently put the game out of reach, after Manning threw his seventh touchdown pass of the game – a 78-yarder to Demaryius Thomas.

Notes

The start of the game was delayed 33 minutes due to lightning in the Denver area.

Week 2: at New York Giants

Coming off their season-opening win over the defending Super Bowl champion Ravens, the Broncos traveled to East Rutherford, New Jersey, for an interconference duel against the New York Giants at MetLife Stadium. The Giants grabbed the lead midway through the first quarter, with a 36-yard field goal by placekicker Josh Brown. In the second quarter, a 20-yard touchdown run by running back Knowshon Moreno gave the Broncos the lead. Two field goals by Brown – from 24 and 41 yards – gave the Giants a 9–7 lead. The Broncos re-claimed the lead just before halftime, with placekicker Matt Prater nailing a 42-yard field goal. The Broncos increased their lead in the third quarter, with quarterback Peyton Manning connecting on a 2-yard touchdown pass to wide receiver Wes Welker. The Giants responded, with running back Brandon Jacobs rushing for a 1-yard touchdown to pull the Giants to within 17–16 with three minutes remaining in the third quarter. However, the Broncos seized control of the game with 21 unanswered points, beginning with a 25-yard touchdown run by Moreno, followed in the fourth quarter by an 11-yard touchdown pass from Peyton Manning to tight end Julius Thomas, and return specialist Trindon Holliday returning a punt 81 yards for a touchdown. The Giants tried to rally, with quarterback Eli Manning throwing a 23-yard touchdown pass to running back Da'Rel Scott with four minutes remaining in the fourth quarter, but a 47-yard field goal by Prater put the game out of reach.

Notes

Peyton Manning improved his head-to-head record against Eli Manning to 3–0. This would be the last time the Manning brothers played against each other in the NFL, with Peyton retiring following the 2015 season.

Injuries

Offensive tackle Ryan Clady suffered a Lisfranc fracture in his foot late in the fourth quarter, and was placed on injured reserve three days later (September 18).

Week 3: vs. Oakland Raiders

Coming off their win over the Giants, the Broncos returned home for an AFC West duel with the Oakland Raiders on Monday Night Football. The Broncos jumped out to a 17–0 lead, with a two-yard touchdown pass from quarterback Peyton Manning to wide receiver Eric Decker, a 53-yard field goal by placekicker Matt Prater and 12-yard touchdown pass from Manning to wide receiver Wes Welker, the latter of which occurred in the second quarter. The Raiders got on the scoreboard when quarterback Terrelle Pryor completed a 73-yard touchdown pass to wide receiver Denarius Moore. The Broncos subsequently added to their lead, with Manning throwing a 13-yard touchdown pass to tight end Julius Thomas, followed by two field goals by Prater – a 41-yarder just before halftime and a 40-yarder midway through the third quarter. Following a Manning fumble, the Raiders narrowed the Broncos' lead, with Pryor tossing the football on a running play to running back Darren McFadden, and McFadden throwing a 16-yard touchdown pass to fullback Marcel Reece, however, the Broncos responded early in the fourth quarter, with running back Ronnie Hillman rushing for a 1-yard touchdown. The Raiders scored a late touchdown, with McFadden rushing for a 1-yard touchdown, however, the Broncos recovered the ensuing onside kick, sealing the win.

Notes

Week 4: vs. Philadelphia Eagles

Coming off their Monday Night win over the Raiders, the Broncos remained on home ground for an interconference duel with the Philadelphia Eagles. A 6-yard touchdown pass from quarterback Peyton Manning to wide receiver Wes Welker gave the Broncos the early lead. The Eagles countered, with a 35-yard field goal by placekicker Alex Henery, however, the Broncos subsequently increased their lead, with return specialist Trindon Holliday returning the ensuing kickoff 105 yards for a touchdown. The Eagles cut into the Broncos' lead in the second quarter, with a 25-yard field goal by Henery, followed by running back Chris Polk rushing for a 4-yard touchdown to pull to within 14–13. However, the Broncos proceeded to score 38 unanswered points and take control of the game. First, running back Knowshon Moreno rushed for a 4-yard touchdown. Then in the third quarter, Manning added three more touchdown passes – a 1-yarder and a 15-yarder to wide receiver Demaryius Thomas, followed by a 4-yarder to Welker. In the fourth quarter, Broncos' linebacker Steven Johnson blocked Donnie Jones' punt and immediately returned the football 17 yards for a touchdown, which was followed by a 53-yard field goal by placekicker Matt Prater. The Eagles scored a late touchdown, with quarterback Nick Foles, playing in place of Michael Vick, completing a 6-yard touchdown pass to wide receiver Jeff Maehl, but the outcome of the game had already been decided in the Broncos' favor.

Notes

Former offensive lineman Tom Nalen, who played with the Broncos from 1994 to 2007, was inducted to the Broncos Ring of Fame during halftime. Nalen made it to five Pro Bowls, earning the NFL's Offensive Lineman of the Year award in 2003, and was an integral part of 11 seasons in which the Broncos had at least one running back rush for 1,000 yards within a season. Steven Johnson's return of a blocked punt for a touchdown marked the first such play for the Broncos' special teams since 2000.

Week 5: at Dallas Cowboys

Coming off their blowout win over the Eagles, the Broncos traveled to Arlington, Texas, for an interconference duel with the Dallas Cowboys at AT&T Stadium. The Cowboys grabbed a 14–0 lead in the first quarter, with a 2-yard touchdown pass from quarterback Tony Romo to wide receiver Dez Bryant, followed by running back DeMarco Murray rushing for a 4-yard touchdown. The latter score occurred after a fumble by Broncos' wide receiver Eric Decker. The Broncos later got on the scoreboard, with quarterback Peyton Manning connecting on a 4-yard shovel pass to tight end Julius Thomas for a touchdown. Early in the second quarter, a 43-yard field goal by placekicker Dan Bailey gave the Cowboys a 17–7 lead. The Broncos then reeled off 21 unanswered points, with Manning adding two more touchdown passes – a 2-yarder to Decker and a 9-yarder to Thomas, followed by Manning rushing for a 1-yard touchdown on a bootleg play. A 48-yard field goal by Bailey at the end of the first half narrowed the Broncos' lead to 28–20.

The Broncos added to their lead midway through the third quarter, with Manning connecting on a 2-yard touchdown pass to wide receiver Wes Welker. However, the Cowboys subsequently began chipping away at the Broncos' lead, with Romo connecting on an 82-yard touchdown pass to wide receiver Terrance Williams. A 48-yard field goal by placekicker Matt Prater gave the Broncos a 38–27 lead, but the Cowboys further narrowed the Broncos' lead, with a 2-yard touchdown pass from Romo to Bryant (with an unsuccessful two-point conversion attempt). On the Broncos' next possession, Manning threw his first interception of the season, and the Cowboys subsequently re-claimed the lead early in the fourth quarter, with Romo throwing a 10-yard touchdown pass to tight end Jason Witten, coupled with a two-point pass from Romo to Williams. The Broncos tied the game at 41–41 on their next possession, with a 50-yard field goal by Prater, however, on the Cowboys' next possession, Romo connected on a 4-yard touchdown pass to wide receiver Cole Beasley to give the Cowboys a 48–41 lead with 7:19 remaining in the fourth quarter. Manning subsequently led the Broncos on a 9-play, 73-yard drive, which culminated with running back Knowshon Moreno rushing for a 1-yard touchdown to tie the game at 48–48 with 2:24 remaining in the fourth quarter. Two plays into the Cowboys' next possession, as the Cowboys were attempting a game-winning drive, Romo was intercepted by Broncos' linebacker Danny Trevathan at the Cowboys' 24-yard line just before the two-minute warning. On the fourth play of the Broncos' final possession, the Broncos were facing a 3rd-and-1 at the Cowboys' 2-yard line, after the Cowboys had exhausted two of their three team timeouts. Moreno earned a crucial first down after Manning implored him to go down before reaching the goal line instead of scoring a touchdown, which forced the Cowboys to burn their final timeout with 1:35 remaining in the fourth quarter. After three kneel-downs by Manning, Prater nailed the game-winning 28-yard field goal as time expired.

Notes

This was the only game during the  season in which the Broncos wore their alternate navy blue jerseys.

Week 6: vs. Jacksonville Jaguars

Coming off their comeback win over the Cowboys, the Broncos returned home for an AFC match against the Jacksonville Jaguars. The Broncos entered the game as the largest favorites (27 points) in NFL history. The Broncos started their dominance by jumping out to a 14–0 lead in the first quarter, with quarterback Peyton Manning throwing a pair of touchdown passes – a 3-yarder to tight end Julius Thomas and a 20-yarder to wide receiver Wes Welker. The Jaguars outscored the Broncos 12–0 in the second quarter, with a pair of field goals from placekicker Josh Scobee – from 50 and 30 yards out, followed by linebacker Paul Posluszny returning a Manning interception 59 yards for a touchdown (with an unsuccessful two-point attempt). On the opening drive of the third quarter, Broncos' running back Knowshon Moreno rushed for a 1-yard touchdown, however, the Jaguars had a response, with running back Maurice Jones-Drew rushing for a 5-yard touchdown to pull to within 21–19 midway through the third quarter. The Broncos subsequently added to their lead, with Moreno rushing for a pair of touchdowns – an 8-yarder followed by a 3-yarder at the 9:09 mark of the fourth quarter, the latter of which was the final scoring play of the game. The Jaguars attempted a rally, but the Broncos' defense stood their ground on the Jaguars' final two offensive possessions.

Week 7: at Indianapolis Colts

Coming off their win over the Jaguars, the Broncos traveled to Lucas Oil Stadium for an AFC duel with the Indianapolis Colts. The Broncos grabbed the early lead in the first quarter, with quarterback Peyton Manning connecting with wide receiver Eric Decker on a 17-yard touchdown pass. The Colts responded, with a 27-yard field goal by placekicker Adam Vinatieri. Following a fumble by Broncos' return specialist Trindon Holliday on a punt return, the Colts grabbed the lead, with quarterback Andrew Luck completing an 11-yard touchdown pass to wide receiver Darrius Heyward-Bey. The Broncos re-claimed the lead in the second quarter, with Manning throwing a 12-yard touchdown pass to tight end Julius Thomas. On the Broncos next possession, Colts' linebacker Robert Mathis forced a fumble off Manning out of the end zone, resulting in a safety. The Colts subsequently re-claimed the lead, with Luck connecting on a 20-yard touchdown pass to fullback Stanley Havili, then added to their lead, with an 8-yard touchdown pass from Luck to tight end Coby Fleener just before halftime.

The Broncos' offense went three-and-out on their first three possessions of the third quarter, and the Colts took a 33–14 lead, with Luck rushing for a 10-yard touchdown. Late in the third quarter, the Broncos tried to cut into the Colts lead, with a 31-yard field goal by placekicker Matt Prater, but the Colts responded early in the fourth quarter, with a 52-yard field goal by Vinatieri. Trailing 36–17, the Broncos attempted a rally, with Manning connecting on a 31-yard touchdown pass to wide receiver Demaryius Thomas (with a failed two-point conversion attempt), followed by a 1-yard touchdown run by running back Knowshon Moreno. The latter score occurred after Broncos' safety Duke Ihenacho forced a fumble off Colts' running back Trent Richardson deep in Colts' territory. The Broncos' defense forced a punt on the Colts next possession. However, with 7:07 remaining in the fourth quarter, Manning's arm was hit by Colts' linebacker Erik Walden, and his pass was subsequently intercepted by linebacker Pat Angerer deep in Broncos' territory. Four plays later, a Vinatieri 42-yard field goal gave the Colts a 39–30 lead with 6:06 remaining. Eight plays into the Broncos' next possession, running back Ronnie Hillman lost a fumble at the Colts' 3-yard line at the 3:15 mark of the fourth quarter, just as the Broncos were attempting to narrow the Colts' lead. The Colts' offense subsequently ran time off the clock, forcing the Broncos to burn all three of their team timeouts. The Broncos tried a desperation rally with 1:28 remaining, with Prater nailing a 47-yard field goal with only 17 seconds remaining. However, the ensuing onside kick was unsuccessful, sealing the win for the Colts.

Notes

With the loss, the Broncos' 17-game regular season winning streak was snapped. This marked Peyton Manning's first visit to Indianapolis since he was released by the Colts in March 2012. Manning was the Colts' starting quarterback from 1998 to 2010, before missing the entire  season due to multiple neck surgeries.

Week 8: vs. Washington Redskins

Hoping to recover from their first loss of the season at Indianapolis, the Broncos returned home for an interconference match against the Washington Redskins. A 6-yard touchdown pass from quarterback Peyton Manning to wide receiver Wes Welker gave the Broncos the early lead. The Redskins tied the game just before halftime, with quarterback Robert Griffin III connecting on a 7-yard touchdown pass to wide receiver Leonard Hankerson. Early in the third quarter, the Redskins grabbed a 21–7 lead, with two touchdowns in only 19 seconds – both off Manning turnovers. Following a Manning fumble, Redskins' running back Alfred Morris rushed for a 1-yard touchdown. On the first play of the Broncos' next possession, Manning was intercepted by cornerback DeAngelo Hall, who returned the football 26 yards for a touchdown. However, the Broncos scored the final 38 points of the game. Midway through the third quarter, running back Montee Ball rushed for a 4-yard touchdown. At the beginning of the fourth quarter, Manning connected on a 1-yard touchdown pass to tight end Joel Dreessen to tie the game at 21–21. The Redskins' offense went three-and-out on their next possession, and after punter Sav Rocca shanked a punt to the Redskins' 35-yard line, the Broncos immediately grabbed the lead on the first play of their next possession, with Manning throwing a 35-yard touchdown pass to running back Knowshon Moreno on a screen play. On the Redskins' next possession, Broncos' linebacker Von Miller forced a fumble off RGIII deep in Redskins' territory, though the Broncos had to settle on a 19-yard field goal by placekicker Matt Prater. Midway through the fourth quarter, Manning threw his fourth touchdown pass of the game – a 35-yarder to wide receiver Demaryius Thomas. The final scoring play of the game came courtesy of cornerback Dominique Rodgers-Cromartie returning an interception off Redskins' quarterback Kirk Cousins 75 yards for a touchdown.

Notes

This was Redskins' head coach Mike Shanahan's first visit to Denver since being fired by the Broncos after the 2008 season. Shanahan, who coached the Broncos from 1995 to 2008, is the winningest head coach in Broncos' franchise history, with 146 wins. This was the Broncos' final home game against Washington under the "Redskins" moniker, as Washington adopted a temporary moniker in 2020.

Week 10: at San Diego Chargers

Coming off their win over the Redskins and subsequent bye week, the Broncos traveled to Qualcomm Stadium for an AFC West duel with the San Diego Chargers. A 74-yard touchdown pass from quarterback Peyton Manning to tight end Julius Thomas in the first quarter gave the Broncos the early lead. Two second-quarter field goals by Chargers' placekicker Nick Novak – from 26 and 40 yards out – narrowed the Broncos lead. However, the Broncos struck back, with Manning connecting on three touchdown passes to wide receiver Demaryius Thomas – an 11-yarder, a 7-yarder just before halftime and a 34-yarder on the opening possession of the second half, which increased the Broncos' lead to 28–6. On the Broncos' next possession, Chargers' linebacker Tourek Williams forced a fumble off Manning deep in Broncos' territory, and the Chargers immediately capitalized two plays later, with quarterback Philip Rivers throwing a 7-yard touchdown pass to running back Danny Woodhead. The Chargers further narrowed the Broncos' lead early in the fourth quarter, with running back Ryan Mathews rushing for a 1-yard touchdown to pull to within 28–20 with 10:44 remaining in the fourth quarter. The Chargers' defense forced a punt on the Broncos' next possession, and with 6:43 left in the game, the Chargers tried to rally, however, the Broncos' defense forced a Chargers' punt with 3:37 remaining, and the Broncos' offense subsequently ran out the clock.

Week 11: vs. Kansas City Chiefs

Coming off their win over the Chargers, the Broncos returned home for an AFC West duel with the 9–0 Kansas City Chiefs. The Broncos jumped out to a 10–0 lead in the first quarter, with a 54-yard field goal by placekicker Matt Prater, followed by a 9-yard touchdown pass from quarterback Peyton Manning to tight end Julius Thomas. The Chiefs got on the scoreboard early in the second quarter, with a 6-yard touchdown pass from quarterback Alex Smith to wide receiver Dwayne Bowe. The Broncos immediately responded, with running back Montee Ball rushing for a 1-yard touchdown. The Chiefs pulled to within 17–10, with a 20-yard field goal by placekicker Ryan Succop. The Broncos added to their lead late in the third quarter, with an 8-yard touchdown run by Ball, followed by a 36-yard field goal by Prater midway through the fourth quarter. The Chiefs tried to rally, with Smith connecting on a 10-yard touchdown pass to tight end Anthony Fasano, and forced a Broncos' punt with one minute remaining in the game, but the Broncos' defense stood their ground to hand the Chiefs their first loss of the season.

Week 12: at New England Patriots

Coming off their win over the Chiefs, the Broncos traveled to Foxborough, Massachusetts to face the New England Patriots at Gillette Stadium. This was the 14th meeting between quarterbacks Peyton Manning and Tom Brady since . The Broncos jumped out to a 17–0 lead in the first quarter off three Patriots' turnovers. First, linebacker Von Miller returned a fumble 60 yards for a touchdown. Then, after another Patriots' fumble, running back Knowshon Moreno rushed for a 2-yard touchdown. Placekicker Matt Prater added a 27-yard field goal after yet another Patriots' fumble. The Broncos increased their lead to 24–0 midway through the second quarter, with Manning connecting on a 10-yard touchdown pass to tight end Jacob Tamme.

The Patriots then reeled off 31 unanswered points, 14 of which came off two Broncos' turnovers. The Patriots took the opening possession of the second half and got on the scoreboard, with Brady connecting on a 5-yard touchdown pass to wide receiver Julian Edelman. Following a fumble by Broncos' running back Montee Ball, the Patriots scored again, with running back Brandon Bolden rushing for a 1-yard touchdown. After forcing a Broncos' punt, the Patriots pulled to within 24–21 near the end of the third quarter, with Brady throwing a 6-yard touchdown pass to tight end Rob Gronkowski. On the second play of the Broncos' next possession, Manning was intercepted by Patriots' cornerback Logan Ryan early in the fourth quarter, and three plays later, Brady connected on another touchdown pass to Edelman – from 14 yards out – to give the Patriots a 28–24 lead. The Broncos went three-and-out on their next offensive possession, and the Patriots subsequently added to their lead, with a 31-yard field goal by placekicker Stephen Gostkowski midway through the fourth quarter. The Broncos snapped the Patriots' streak of 31 unanswered points and tied the game on their next possession, with a 10-play, 80-yard drive, culminating with an 11-yard touchdown pass from Manning to wide receiver Demaryius Thomas, sending the game to overtime.

Each team traded punts on their first two overtime possessions, and after the Patriots' second punt, Broncos' cornerback Tony Carter inadvertently made contact with the football as he was trying to get out of the way of a bouncing punt, with Patriots' safety Nate Ebner recovering the fumble at the Broncos' 13-yard line. Three plays later, Gostkowski nailed the game-winning 30-yard field goal with 1:56 remaining in overtime.

Notes

This marked wide receiver Wes Welker's first visit to New England, where he was a standout Pro Bowler with the team from 2007 to 2012. Tom Brady improved his head-to-head record against Peyton Manning to 10–4, while Manning suffered his 14th career loss in 21 starts against the Patriots.

Week 13: at Kansas City Chiefs

Hoping to rebound from their overtime loss to the Patriots, the Broncos traveled to Arrowhead Stadium for an AFC West rematch with the Kansas City Chiefs. The Broncos and Chiefs entered the game tied for the AFC West division lead, both with 9–2 records. The Chiefs grabbed the lead late in the first quarter, with quarterback Alex Smith throwing a 17-yard touchdown pass to wide receiver Junior Hemingway. The Broncos responded at the beginning of the second quarter, with quarterback Peyton Manning throwing a 41-yard touchdown pass to wide receiver Eric Decker. However, Chiefs' running back Knile Davis returned the ensuing kickoff 108 yards for a touchdown, and following a Manning interception on the Broncos' next possession, Smith connected with tight end Anthony Fasano on a 12-yard touchdown pass to give the Chiefs a 21–7 lead. The Broncos then reeled off 28 unanswered points, beginning with a 3-yard touchdown pass from Manning to running back Knowshon Moreno. Manning then connected with Decker on three more touchdown passes – a 37-yarder and a 15-yarder in the third quarter, followed by a 1-yarder early in the fourth quarter. A 1-yard touchdown run by Chiefs' running back Jamaal Charles narrowed the Broncos' lead to 35–28 with 6:32 remaining in the fourth quarter, and the Chiefs' defense forced a punt on the Broncos' next possession. The Chiefs' offense had one last possession with 3:32 remaining in the fourth quarter, and Smith drove the Chiefs to as far as the Broncos' 13-yard line with 1:51 remaining. However, Broncos' safety Mike Adams deflected a fourth-down pass from Smith that was intended for wide receiver Dwayne Bowe near the goal line, and the Broncos subsequently ran out the clock.

Notes

With the win, the Broncos swept the Chiefs for a second consecutive season.

Week 14: vs. Tennessee Titans

Coming off their win over the Chiefs, the Broncos returned home for an AFC duel with the Tennessee Titans. The Titans struck first on their opening possession, with running back Shonn Greene rushing for a 1-yard touchdown. The Broncos responded, with quarterback Peyton Manning throwing a 1-yard touchdown pass to wide receiver Wes Welker. Titans' running back Leon Washington then returned the ensuing kickoff 95 yards to the Broncos' 3-yard line, and the Titans subsequently re-claimed the lead, with a 3-yard touchdown run by running back Chris Johnson. The Broncos narrowed the Titans' lead toward the end of the first quarter, with a 25-yard field goal by placekicker Matt Prater. Midway through the second quarter, Greene rushed for a 28-yard touchdown, which gave the Titans a 21–10 lead. Just after the two-minute warning, Manning connected with tight end Julius Thomas on an 8-yard touchdown pass, and just before halftime, Prater nailed an NFL-record 64-yard field goal. The Broncos claimed the lead on the opening possession of the second half, with Manning throwing a 4-yard touchdown pass to wide receiver Demaryius Thomas, then increased their lead, with running back Knowshon Moreno rushing for a 1-yard touchdown. The Titans tried to cut into the Broncos' lead, with quarterback Ryan Fitzpatrick connecting on a 41-yard touchdown pass to wide receiver Justin Hunter. However, the Broncos pulled away in the fourth quarter, with a 19-yard field goal by Prater, a 20-yard touchdown pass from Manning to wide receiver Eric Decker and a 5-yard touchdown run by running back Montee Ball.

Notes

With the win, the Broncos clinched a playoff berth.

Week 15: vs. San Diego Chargers

Coming off their win over the Titans, the Broncos remained on home ground for an AFC West rematch with the San Diego Chargers on Thursday Night Football. A 15-yard touchdown pass from quarterback Peyton Manning to wide receiver Andre Caldwell gave the Broncos the early lead. The Chargers subsequently got on the board, with a 38-yard field goal by placekicker Nick Novak. The Broncos answered, with a 32-yard field goal by placekicker Matt Prater. However, the Chargers scored 21 unanswered points and dominated the time of possession, as the Broncos' offense went three-and-out on all three of their second quarter possessions. A 19-yard touchdown pass from quarterback Philip Rivers to wide receiver Keenan Allen tied the game, and the Chargers grabbed the lead late in the first half, with a 10-yard touchdown pass from Rivers to Allen. The Chargers took the opening possession of the second half and increased their lead, culminating with running back Ryan Mathews rushing for a 23-yard touchdown. The Broncos were forced to punt after only four plays on their initial possession of the second half, and the Chargers' ball control offense subsequently ate up over eight minutes of the third quarter, though the Broncos' defense forced a Chargers' punt. The Broncos cut into the Chargers' lead in the fourth quarter, with a 5-yard touchdown pass from Manning to Caldwell with 10:30 remaining in the game. After forcing a Chargers' punt, the Broncos offense got the football with 5:50 remaining, however, three plays later, Manning was intercepted by Chargers' linebacker Thomas Keiser at the Broncos' 39-yard line. Six plays later, a 35-yard field goal by Novak increased the Chargers' lead to 27–17 with 2:41 remaining. With no timeouts remaining (save the two-minute warning), the Broncos tried to rally, with Prater kicking a 42-yard field goal with only 34 seconds remaining. However, the Broncos' onside kick attempt was unsuccessful, sealing the win for the Chargers.

Notes

With the loss, the Broncos had their 13-game regular-season home winning streak snapped, as well as their 10-game winning streak against division opponents.

Week 16: at Houston Texans

Hoping to rebound from their loss to the Chargers, the Broncos traveled to Reliant Stadium for an AFC match with the Houston Texans. The two teams traded field goals in the first quarter, with a 32-yarder by Broncos' placekicker Matt Prater and a 45-yarder by Texans' placekicker Randy Bullock. The Broncos grabbed the lead early in the second quarter, with a 36-yard touchdown pass from quarterback Peyton Manning to wide receiver Demaryius Thomas. A 35-yard field goal by Bullock narrowed the Broncos' lead, but the Broncos increased it with two field goals from Prater in the final minute of the first half – a 25-yarder and a 44-yarder. A 15-yard touchdown pass from Texans' quarterback Matt Schaub to wide receiver Keshawn Martin was the only scoring play of the third quarter, which narrowed the Broncos' lead to 16–13. After Broncos' safety Mike Adams intercepted Schaub early in the fourth quarter, the Broncos subsequently pulled away, with Manning throwing two touchdown passes to wide receiver Eric Decker – a 10-yarder and a 20-yarder. Later in the fourth quarter, Manning threw his 51st touchdown pass of the season – a 25-yarder to tight end Julius Thomas, in which Manning set a new NFL record for touchdown passes in a single season.

Notes

With the win, coupled with the Kansas City Chiefs' loss to the Indianapolis Colts, the Broncos clinched the AFC West division title. This was the 13th division title in the Broncos' franchise history, surpassing the Oakland Raiders for the all-time lead in AFC West championships since the 1970 AFL–NFL merger. It also marked the first time in franchise history that the Broncos clinched three consecutive AFC West division titles.

Week 17: at Oakland Raiders

Hoping to gain momentum into the playoffs, the Broncos traveled to the O.co Coliseum for an AFC West divisional rematch with the Oakland Raiders, in the  regular season finale. The Broncos dominated this game from the start. In the first quarter, quarterback Peyton Manning threw a pair of touchdown passes – a 3-yarder to wide receiver Eric Decker and a 7-yarder to running back Knowshon Moreno. In the second quarter, placekicker Matt Prater added a 34-yard field goal, and later in the second quarter, Manning connected with wide receiver Demaryius Thomas on a 63-yard touchdown pass. This gave the Broncos a 24–0 lead, in which the Broncos set a new NFL record for points scored in a single season. Just before halftime, Manning once again connected with Thomas on another touchdown pass – from 5 yards out, in which Manning set a new NFL record for single-season passing yardage. Manning sat out the entire second half, and backup quarterback Brock Osweiler took over. After a scoreless third quarter, Prater added a 54-yard field goal in the fourth quarter. The Raiders finally got on the scoreboard, with quarterback Terrelle Pryor throwing a pair of touchdown passes – a 14-yarder to wide receiver Rod Streater and a 9-yarder to tight end Nick Kasa, but the outcome of the game had already been decided in the Broncos' favor.

Notes

With the win, the Broncos clinched a first-round bye and homefield advantage throughout the AFC playoffs, as well as sweeping their division rivals on the road for the fourth time in five seasons.

Standings

Division

Conference

Postseason

Schedule

Game summaries

AFC Divisional Playoffs: vs. (6) San Diego Chargers

Following a first-round bye, the Broncos began their run in the 2013–14 NFL playoffs at home by welcoming their AFC West division rivals, the San Diego Chargers, in the teams' first-ever playoff meeting. The Broncos grabbed the lead late in the first quarter, with quarterback Peyton Manning connecting on a 2-yard touchdown pass to wide receiver Demaryius Thomas. After Chargers' placekicker Nick Novak missed a 53-yard field goal early in the second quarter, the Broncos added to their lead, with Manning throwing a 3-yard touchdown pass to wide receiver Wes Welker. Just before halftime, the Broncos tried to add to their lead, after wide receiver Eric Decker stumbled on a long punt return, when it appeared that he was headed to the end zone for a touchdown. However, eight plays later, Manning was intercepted in the end zone by Chargers' linebacker Donald Butler. A 45-yard field goal by Broncos' placekicker Matt Prater on the opening possession of the second half was the only scoring play of the third quarter, as Prater later missed a 47-yard field goal toward the end of the third quarter. The Chargers finally got on the scoreboard at the 13:03 mark of the fourth quarter, with quarterback Philip Rivers connecting on a 16-yard touchdown pass to wide receiver Keenan Allen. The Broncos subsequently responded, with running back Knowshon Moreno rushing for a 3-yard touchdown. Trailing 24–7 with 8:12 remaining in the game, the Chargers attempted a rally on their next possession. The Chargers were facing a 4th-and-5 on their own 36-yard line, and Rivers connected on a 49-yard pass to Allen to keep the Chargers alive. Three plays later, Rivers connected with Allen on another 16-yard touchdown pass. After the Chargers recovered the ensuing onside kick, a 30-yard field goal by Novak pulled the Chargers to within 24–17 with 3:56 remaining in the game. The Broncos' offense then ran out the clock, which included Manning completing two critical third-down passing plays to tight end Julius Thomas and Moreno converting a 3rd-and-1 into a game-clinching first down.

With the win, the Broncos advanced to the AFC Championship game for the first time since 2005.

AFC Championship: vs. (2) New England Patriots

Coming off their win over the Chargers in the Divisional round, the Broncos welcomed the No. 2 seed New England Patriots to Sports Authority Field at Mile High, for the AFC Championship. The Broncos' defense forced the Patriots' offense to go three-and-out on their first two offensive possessions. The Broncos were forced to punt on their first offensive possession, but did not punt for the remainder of the game. A 27-yard field goal by placekicker Matt Prater gave the Broncos the lead late in the first quarter. After the Broncos' defense forced another Patriots' punt, the Broncos put together a 15-play, 93-yard drive that chewed up seven minutes of the second quarter, and added to their lead, with quarterback Peyton Manning connecting on a 1-yard touchdown pass to tight end Jacob Tamme. The two teams then subsequently traded field goals, with a 47-yarder by Patriots' placekicker Stephen Gostkowski and a 35-yarder by Prater just before halftime, to give the Broncos a 13–3 lead.

The Broncos took the opening possession of the second half and added to their lead, with a 13-play, 80-yard drive that chewed up the first seven minutes of the third quarter, culminating with Manning throwing a 3-yard touchdown pass to wide receiver Demaryius Thomas. On the Patriots' first offensive possession of the second half, the Patriots drove to the Broncos' 29-yard line and faced a 4th-and-2, however, Broncos' defensive tackle Terrance Knighton sacked Patriots' quarterback Tom Brady, forcing a turnover on downs. The Broncos subsequently added to lead early in the fourth quarter, with a 19-yard field goal by Prater. The Patriots finally got into the end zone on their next possession, with Brady connecting on a 7-yard touchdown pass to wide receiver Julian Edelman, but the Broncos subsequently added to their lead, with Prater nailing a 54-yard field goal with seven minutes remaining. Trailing 26–10, the Patriots tried to rally, with Brady scrambling up the middle for a 5-yard touchdown run. However, the Broncos' defense subsequently thwarted a two-point conversion attempt by Patriots' running back Shane Vereen to get the Patriots to within a one-score deficit, keeping the score at 26–16 with 3:13 remaining in the game. The Patriots tried an onside kick, but Broncos' wide receiver Eric Decker recovered the football near midfield. The Broncos' offense then forced the Patriots to use all of their timeouts and ran out the clock, aided by a critical 5-yard run on 4th-and-2 by running back Montee Ball just after the two-minute warning.

With the win, the Broncos advanced to Super Bowl XLVIII, the team's first Super Bowl appearance since winning back-to-back Super Bowls in 1997 and 1998.

Notes

This was head coach John Fox's first win over Bill Belichick and the Patriots in the postseason, previously losing to the Patriots in the 2011 Divisional playoffs, and Super Bowl XXXVIII as Carolina Panthers' head coach.

Super Bowl XLVIII: vs. (N1) Seattle Seahawks

On the first offensive play of the game, an errant snap by Broncos' center Manny Ramirez over the head of quarterback Peyton Manning resulted in a safety that gave the Seahawks the early lead only 12 seconds into the game. Placekicker Steven Hauschka added field goals of 31 and 33 yards to give the Seahawks an 8–0 lead after the first quarter. The Broncos' offense went three-and-out on their second offensive possession, and three plays into the Broncos' third offensive possession, Manning was intercepted by Seahawks' safety Kam Chancellor at the Broncos' 39-yard line toward the end of the first quarter. Early in the second quarter, the Seahawks added to their lead, with running back Marshawn Lynch rushing for a 1-yard touchdown. The Broncos earned their first 1st-down on their next offensive possession at the 10:13 mark of the second quarter, however, the Seahawks' defense forced another turnover off Manning – defensive end Cliff Avril altered a pass by Manning, and linebacker Malcolm Smith intercepted the football and returned it 69 yards for a touchdown. The Broncos' offense drove to the Seahawks' 19-yard line one minute before halftime, and decided to go for a first down instead of kick a field goal. However, a short pass from Manning intended for wide receiver Demaryius Thomas was deflected by Avril and fell incomplete, giving the Seahawks a 22–0 halftime lead.

Things got much worse for the Broncos, as Seahawks' wide receiver/return specialist Percy Harvin returned the opening kickoff of the second half 87 yards for a touchdown. The two teams then traded punts on their next possessions, and later in the third quarter, Seahawks' cornerback Byron Maxwell forced a fumble off Demaryius Thomas, and the Seahawks capitalized six plays later, with quarterback Russell Wilson connecting with wide receiver Jermaine Kearse on a 23-yard touchdown pass to give the Seahawks a commanding 36–0 lead. The Broncos finally got on the scoreboard at the end of the third quarter, with a 14-yard touchdown pass from Manning to Demaryius Thomas (coupled with a two-point pass from Manning to wide receiver Wes Welker). This was the Broncos' only scoring play of the game, and the Seahawks added one more scoring play early in the fourth quarter, with a 10-yard touchdown pass from Wilson to wide receiver Doug Baldwin.

With the loss, the Broncos' record in Super Bowls dropped to 2–5.

Notes

This marked cornerback Champ Bailey's final game in a Broncos' uniform, as he was released on March 6, 2014.

Statistics

Team leaders

League rankings

Records and milestones
Numerous individual, franchise and league records and milestones were either tied, reached or broken during the season:

Team
Week 4: The Broncos set two franchise records – points scored in a single game (52) and consecutive regular-season wins (15).
September: The month of September marked the first time in Broncos' franchise history that two players earned player of the month awards in the same month, with quarterback Peyton Manning earning the AFC Offensive player of the Month award and return specialist Trindon Holliday earning the Special Teams Player of the Month award.
Week 5: Set a new NFL record for points scored within the first five games of a season, with 230.
Week 8: The Broncos set a franchise record for points in a quarter, with 31, and also set a new NFL record for points scored within the first eight games of a season, with 343.
Week 10: The Broncos' 28–20 win over the San Diego Chargers on November 10 marked the 300th win for Pat Bowlen in his 30th season as the Broncos' team owner – the fastest NFL owner to reach that feat.
Week 14: Set a new franchise record for points scored in a single season; became the first team in NFL history to have four players score at least 10 touchdowns within a single season; became the first team since the AFL–NFL merger to score at least 50 points three times during a single season.
Week 16: Became the first team in NFL history to have five players score at least 10 touchdowns within a single season; John Fox became only the fifth head coach in NFL history to win a division title in each of his first three seasons with a team.
Week 17: Set a new NFL record for points scored in a single season, with 606; became only the third team in NFL history to surpass 7,000 net yards in a single season, with 7,317.
Regular season: Set a new NFL single-season record with 76 touchdowns, eclipsing the previous record of 75 touchdowns that was held by the 2007 New England Patriots; set a new franchise record for first downs in a season, with 435, as well as for total yards from scrimmage, with 7,317.
Super Bowl XLVIII: John Fox became the sixth head coach in NFL history to lead two different teams to a Super Bowl – Fox also lead the Carolina Panthers to Super Bowl XXXVIII.

Peyton Manning
Week 2: Became the third quarterback in NFL history to reach 60,000 passing yards, joining Brett Favre and Dan Marino.
Week 4: Became the first quarterback in NFL history to throw 16 touchdown passes within the first four games of a season; set a new NFL record for four-touchdown games for the 24th time in his career, surpassing Brett Favre; set a personal record for consecutive passes without an interception (201).
Week 5: Set a new NFL record for touchdown passes to start a season without an interception, with 20; surpassed Dan Marino for second-place on the NFL's all-time career passing yards list.
Week 6: Set a new NFL record for touchdown passes within the first six games of a season, with 22.
Week 8: Achieved 2,919 passing yards, setting a new NFL record for the most passing yards within the first eight games of a season.
Week 10: Set a new NFL record for regular-season road wins with 74, surpassing Brett Favre; tied Tom Brady's NFL record for touchdown passes within the first nine games of a season, with 33.
Week 13: Set a new franchise record for touchdown passes in a single season, which Manning previously set in 2012.
Week 14: Set a new franchise record with touchdown passes to four different receivers in a single game; set a new NFL record for games with at least four touchdown passes in a single season; set a new franchise record for pass completions in a single game (39) and tied a franchise record for pass attempts in a single game (59); with the Broncos clinching a playoff berth, Manning surpassed Brett Favre for the most seasons in the playoffs for a quarterback.
Week 15: Set a new career high for passing yards during a single season, which also sets a new franchise record for passing yards during a single season – Manning previously set the record for passing yards in 2012.
Regular season: Set new single-season franchise records for pass completions (450), pass attempts (659) and passer rating (115.3). Manning threw at least one touchdown pass in 49 consecutive games as a Bronco (including the playoffs) – a streak that ended in Week 14 of the 2014 season, shattering the old franchise record of 26 that was held by former Broncos' quarterback Brian Griese.

Other players
Eric Decker: During the Broncos' Week 13 win over the Kansas City Chiefs, Decker became the first player in franchise history to catch four touchdown passes in a single game.
Trindon Holliday: 105-yard kickoff return for a touchdown during the team's Week 4 win over the Philadelphia Eagles tied a record for the longest play in franchise history, which Holliday previously set in 2012.
Knowshon Moreno: During the Broncos' Week 16 win over the Houston Texans, Moreno became the first player in franchise history to rush for over 1,000 yards and receive over 500 yards during the same season.
Matt Prater:
Week 14: Prater kicked a 64-yard field goal, which, at the time, was the longest in NFL history, until Baltimore Ravens' placekicker Justin Tucker surpassed that record with a 66-yard field goal in 2021.
Regular season: Set a new NFL record for extra points in a single season, with 75; set a new single-season franchise record for points scored in a season, with 150, surpassing the previous record of 138 that was held by Terrell Davis in 1998.
Demaryius Thomas:
Regular season: Tied a franchise record for receiving touchdowns in a single season, with 14.
Super Bowl XLVIII: Demaryius Thomas recorded 13 pass receptions, which, at the time, set a new Super Bowl record, until New England Patriots' running back James White surpassed that record in Super Bowl LI, with 14 receptions.
Julius Thomas: During the Broncos' Week 14 win over the Tennessee Titans, Julius Thomas set a new franchise record for the most touchdown receptions by a tight end in a single season, surpassing the previous record of 10 touchdowns that was held by Shannon Sharpe in 1996.

Passing yardage controversy
On December 31, 2013, two days after the end of the regular season, media reports indicated that Peyton Manning's passing yardage record was being reviewed by the NFL. Manning sat out the second half of the Broncos' Week 17 win over the Oakland Raiders, after he had eclipsed Drew Brees' record for single-season passing yardage by one yard just before halftime. However, Manning's record was called into question, due to a play that could have been ruled as a running play instead of a forward pass. Near the end of the first quarter of the Broncos' Week 17 win over the Raiders, Manning completed what was, at the time, ruled as a 7-yard pass to wide receiver Eric Decker. However, the pass appeared to be a lateral from CBS camera angles, as Manning appeared to throw the football from the Broncos' 49-yard line, and Decker appeared to catch the pass from the Broncos' 48-yard line, indicating that the play should have been recorded as a running play, not a passing play. Manning later set the single-season passing yardage record with a 5-yard touchdown pass to wide receiver Demaryius Thomas just before halftime. After further review by the NFL and the Elias Sports Bureau, the league upheld the initial ruling, resulting in Manning's new NFL record for single-season passing yardage remaining intact.

Awards and honors

Pro Bowl and All-Pro selections
Five Broncos were selected to the 2014 Pro Bowl: quarterback Peyton Manning, placekicker Matt Prater, wide receiver Demaryius Thomas, tight end Julius Thomas and guard Louis Vasquez. However, due to participation in Super Bowl XLVIII, none of them participated in the Pro Bowl. Manning and Vasquez were also voted to the  All-Pro First Team, while Prater and Demaryius Thomas were named to the Second Team.

Other news and notes
Sports Authority Field at Mile High underwent $30 million in stadium upgrades prior to the start of the  season, including a new high-definition LED video board on the stadium's south end zone that triples the size of the old video board.
On July 15, 2013, the Broncos suspended two front office executives for separate drunk driving arrests. Tom Heckert, Jr., who was hired as the team's director of pro personnel in May, was suspended for one month without pay stemming from a June 11 arrest in Parker, Colorado, as well as measuring a blood-alcohol level of .162 – twice the legal limit. Matt Russell, the team's director of player personnel, was suspended indefinitely without pay stemming from a July 6 arrest in Summit County, Colorado, in which he collided with two vehicles – one of them a police car, as well as measuring a blood-alcohol level of .246 – three times the legal limit. After the Broncos notified the NFL of its disciplinary plans, the NFL announced that no further punishment will be imposed. On September 16, Russell was reinstated by the Broncos after being suspended for two months.
On December 8, 2013, prior to the Broncos' Week 14 home game vs. Tennessee Titans, the press box at Sports Authority Field at Mile High was officially named the "Jim Saccomano Press Box," in honor of Jim Saccomano, the team's vice president of corporate communications for the past 36 seasons, who announced his retirement effective at the end of the 2013 season.
The paid attendance of 77,110 for the Broncos' AFC Championship game vs. the New England Patriots on January 19, 2014 was the second-largest crowd in team history.

Notes

References

External links

The Denver Post – Complete Broncos Coverage
2013 Season page on Pro Football Reference
NFL Nation Blog – ESPN

Denver
Denver Broncos seasons
Denver Broncos
AFC West championship seasons
American Football Conference championship seasons